The canton of Vaison-la-Romaine is a French administrative division in the department of Vaucluse and region Provence-Alpes-Côte d'Azur.

Composition
At the French canton reorganisation which came into effect in March 2015, the canton was expanded from 13 to 29 communes:

Le Barroux
Beaumont-du-Ventoux
Brantes
Buisson 
Cairanne 
Camaret-sur-Aigues
Crestet 
Entrechaux
Faucon 
Gigondas
Lafare
Malaucène
Puyméras
Rasteau
Roaix 
La Roque-Alric
Sablet
Saint-Léger-du-Ventoux
Saint-Marcellin-lès-Vaison 
Saint-Romain-en-Viennois
Saint-Roman-de-Malegarde 
Savoillan
Séguret 
Suzette
Travaillan
Vacqueyras
Vaison-la-Romaine
Villedieu 
Violès

References

Vaison-la-Romaine